The 1969–70 SM-sarja season was the 39th season of the SM-sarja, the top level of ice hockey in Finland. 10 teams participated in the league, and HIFK Helsinki won the championship.

Regular season

External links
 Season on hockeyarchives.info

Fin
Liiga seasons
SM